Mount Smuts is a  mountain summit located in the Spray Valley, near the northern end of the Spray Mountains range. It is situated on the shared boundary of Peter Lougheed Provincial Park with Banff National Park in the Canadian Rockies of Alberta, Canada. Mount Smuts is not visible from any road in Banff Park, however, it can be seen from Alberta Highway 742, also known as Smith-Dorrien/Spray Trail in Kananaskis Country. Mount Smuts' nearest higher neighbor is Mount Birdwood,  to the south-southeast.


History

Mount Smuts was named by the Interprovincial Boundary Commission in 1918 for General Jan Smuts (1870–1950), a noted South African statesman and mountaineer. During World War I, he led the armies of South Africa against Germany, capturing German South-West Africa and commanding the British Army in East Africa in 1916-1917.

The mountain's toponym was officially adopted in 1924 by the Geographical Names Board of Canada.

The first ascent of the peak was made in 1926 by M. Crosby, M. Kennard, H. S. Crosby, C. A. Willard, with guide Rudolph Aemmer.

Geology

Mount Smuts is composed of sedimentary rock laid down during the Precambrian to Jurassic periods. Formed in shallow seas, this sedimentary rock was pushed east and over the top of younger rock during the Laramide orogeny.

Climate

Based on the Köppen climate classification, Mount Smuts is located in a subarctic climate zone with cold, snowy winters, and mild summers. Precipitation runoff from the mountain drains west into Spray River, or east to Smuts Creek, both of which empty into Spray Lakes Reservoir.

Climbing

Mount Smuts is a difficult and exposed scramble on limestone slabs via the south ridge, and very few parties successfully summit each year. Rope is recommended for anything less than ideal conditions.

See also

 Geography of Alberta
 List of peaks on the Alberta–British Columbia border
 Canadian Rockies

References

Gallery

External links
 Mount Smuts weather: Mountain Forecast
 CBC News: 2018 fatality on Mt. Smuts

Two-thousanders of Alberta
Canadian Rockies
Alberta's Rockies
Mountains of Banff National Park
Jan Smuts